Devi is a surname. Notable people with the surname include:

Annpurna Devi (born 1970), Indian politician
Ashapurna Devi (1909–1995), Indian novelist and poet in Bengali
B. Saroja Devi (1938), Indian actress who has acted in Kannada, Tamil, Telugu and Hindi films
Bindyarani Devi (born 1999), Indian weightlifter
C. A. Bhavani Devi (born 1993), Indian sabre fencer
Durgavati Devi (1907–1999), Indian revolutionary and freedom fighter
Gayatri Devi (1919−2009), Indian women politician
Gulabo Devi (born 1955), Indian politician
Kamala Devi (actress) (1933–2010), actress of Indian and British parentage
Kantavati Devi (died 1799), Nepalese queens consort
Kosala Devi, Indian queen consort
Mahasweta Devi (1926–2016), Indian writer in Bengali and an activist
Mrinalini Devi (1874–1902), Indian translator and the wife of Nobel laureate poet, philosopher, author and musician Rabindranath Tagore
Naiki Devi, 12th-century Indian woman
Nirmala Devi (1927–1996), Indian actress
Norodom Buppha Devi (1943–2019), Cambodian dancer
Phoolan Devi (1963–2001), Indian women politician
Prathima Devi (Kannada actress) (1933–2021), Indian actress
Pratima Devi (painter) (1893–1969), Indian Bengali artist
Rabri Devi (1956), Indian politician
Rassundari Devi (1809–1899), Bengali writer
Rudrama Devi, 13th-century women ruler
Sarada Devi (1853–1920), Hindu religious leader
Savitri Devi (1905–1982), French-born Greek fascist, Nazi sympathizer, and spy
Shakuntala Devi (1929–2013), Indian mental calculator and writer
Shanti Devi (1926–1987), Indian woman who claimed to remember her previous life
Sucharu Devi (1874–1959), Indian women's rights activist
Suniti Devi (1864–1932), Indian women philanthropist
Surabhi Vani Devi (born 1952), Indian politician, academic and artist
Uda Devi (died 1857), warrior in the Indian Rebellion of 1857
Vasundhara Devi (1917–1988), Indian actress, trained Bharathanatyam dancer and carnatic singer

Hindustani-language surnames
Surnames of Hindustani origin